The third and final season, titled level 3, of the Zatch Bell! anime series was directed by Tetsuji Nakamura and Yukio Kaizawa and produced by Toei Animation. Based on the manga series by Makoto Raiku, the season follows the Mamodo Zatch Bell, along with his human partner Kiyo Takamine, on his continuing quest to become king of the Mamodo world, but they both must also contend with an existential threat to Earth. The season adapts volumes 18 through 22 of the manga, before assuming an original plotline roughly parallel to volumes 23 through 29.

Only the first four episodes of the season were edited and dubbed in English, and they premiered on YTV's programming block Bionix in Canada from November 15, 2008, to December 6, 2008. The dubbing was provided by Viz Media. After episode 104, the English broadcast of the show was discontinued, leaving the remainder of the series exclusive to Japan. Viz Media ceased the English translation of the manga series less than one year later after twenty-five volumes. 

The episodes were collected into seventeen DVD compilations by Shogakukan and released between July 7, 2006, and March 7, 2007. The four dubbed episodes of this season were added to the Crunchyroll streaming service along with the previous one hundred episodes in 2016.

Four pieces of theme music are used in the episodes: one opening theme and three closing themes in the Japanese episodes, and one opening and closing theme for the dubbed episodes. For the English release, the opening theme is "Follow the Light," and the ending theme is the instrumental remix of "Zatch Bell! Theme"—both tracks were composed by Thorsten Laewe and Greg Prestopino.

Summary
Set shortly after the events of the previous season, a Mamodo-made kaiju-like superweapon called Faudo emerges on Earth. It was brought along by a seditious Mamodo named Riou, who plots on utilizing it for winning the Mamodo tournament while also risking carnage on Earth's civilization. However, because Faudo is in a hibernation-like state, Riou requires spells of several Mamodo to power it up. He coerces these Mamodo into his allegiance by instilling a curse on their human partners, including Li-en, that will kill them if Faudo is not reanimated in time.

With newer allies, Zatch, Kiyo, and their friends mount an all-out offensive on Riou upon learning about his scheme. They manage to break his curse, saving Li-en and the affected humans, but are unable to prevent Faudo's release. When Kiyo's plan to stall the giant fails, Riou sends it toward Japan to test its capacity, resulting in a frenetic clash between Zatch's allies and Riou's forces during which Wonrei is sent back to the Mamodo world. In the height of the conflict, Riou is dispatched by Zatch's twin brother Zeno Bell and his partner Dufort, who desires to wipe out humanity with Faudo. Although Zatch's allies outnumber them, they are grossly surpassed by Zeno's spells and Dufort's telepathic ability. However, a miracle entity within Zatch arises, allowing him to overcome his brother and return him to the Mamodo world, but not without losing control of Faudo. Zatch and Kiyo take the matter into their own hands and use this newfound power to destroy Faudo just off the shores of Japan, saving the world from doom. 

In the season epilogue, Zatch and Brago, now the only Mamodo left on Earth, are about to battle each other for the crown of their world, but the series ends before a true winner is determined.

Episode list

Notes

References 
General

Specific

2005 Japanese television seasons
2006 Japanese television seasons
Season 3